Mitrofanovka is a rural locality (a settlement) in Alexandrovskoye Rural Settlement, Verkhnekhavsky District, Voronezh Oblast, Russia. The population was 53 as of 2010. There are 2 streets.

Geography 
Mitrofanovka is located 35 km east of Verkhnyaya Khava (the district's administrative centre) by road. Aleksandrovka is the nearest rural locality.

References 

Rural localities in Verkhnekhavsky District